Terry McHugh (born 22 August 1963) is a retired Irish track and field athlete who competed in the javelin throw. His personal best of 82.75 m, set in 2000, is the Irish record. He won twenty-one consecutive Irish Championships from 1984 to 2004.

Career
During his career, McHugh finished tenth at the 1993 World Championships and seventh at the 1994 European Championships. He competed in four Summer Olympics – 1988 (22nd), 1992 (27th), 1996 (29th) and 2000 (20th).

McHugh also competed in two Winter Olympics – 1992 Albertville (32nd in Bobsleigh Men's Two) and 1998 Nagano (27th in Bobsleigh Men's Two & 30th in Bobsleigh Men's Four).

He is the second Irish sportsperson, after sailor David Wilkins, to compete at five Olympics, and the first to compete at six.

Personal life
McHugh has remained close friends with his bobsleigh teammate and former champion discus thrower Garry Power, who now teaches at a school in the UK. McHugh lives in Switzerland with his wife Daniela (former Swiss 400m runner) and son. He returned to Ireland in 2009 for the burial of Power's father, for whom he was a pall-bearer.

Competition record

Seasonal bests by year
1988 - 76.46
1992 - 73.26
1993 - 78.28
1994 - 82.14
1995 - 74.58
1996 - 72.84
1997 - 77.90
1998 - 79.73
1999 - 78.47
2000 - 82.75 NR
2001 - 78.19
2002 - 78.67
2003 - 72.14
2004 - 75.57

References

External links

 Irish Times Profile
 Sports-Reference Profile

1963 births
Living people
People from Clonmel
Irish male javelin throwers
Sportspeople from County Tipperary
Athletes (track and field) at the 1988 Summer Olympics
Athletes (track and field) at the 1992 Summer Olympics
Athletes (track and field) at the 1996 Summer Olympics
Athletes (track and field) at the 2000 Summer Olympics
Bobsledders at the 1992 Winter Olympics
Bobsledders at the 1998 Winter Olympics
Irish male bobsledders
Olympic bobsledders of Ireland
Olympic athletes of Ireland